The gens Travia was an obscure plebeian family at ancient Rome.  Few members of this gens are mentioned by Roman writers, but a number are known from inscriptions.

Praenomina
The main praenomina of the Travii were Titus and Marcus, among the most common names at all periods of Roman history.  A few members of this gens bore other common names, including Gaius, Lucius, Publius, and Quintus.

Members

 Titus Travius, buried at Ameria in Umbria in the latter half of the first century BC.
 Travius, the name by which Pomponius Porphyrion describes a man whose excessive wealth was criticized by Horace in one of his Satires.  Horace calls the man Trausius, an equally obscure nomen.
 Marcus Travius, named in a sepulchral inscription from Aquincum in Pannonia Inferior, dating from the late first century.
 Travius, a soldier in the Legio V, buried in a first- or second-century tomb at Ameria.
 Travia Prima, buried in a first- or second-century tomb at Pisaurum in Umbria, along with Marcus Attius Repens, a local official, and Titus Marius Capito.

Undated Travii
 Gaius Travius Ɔ. l., a freedman buried at Pola in Venetia and Histria.
 Marcus Travius L. f. Saufeius Sabinus, buried at Rome.
 Marcus Travius M. f. Saufeius Sabinus, named in an inscription from Verona in Venetia and Histria.
 Titus Travius T. l. Acutus, a freedman, was an aurifex, or goldsmith, according to an inscription from Ameria, along with the freedman Titus Travius Argentillus.
 Titus Travius T. l. Argentillus, a freedman, was an aurifex, according to an inscription from Ameria, along with the freedman Titus Travius Acutus.  He was also an octovir, in this case perhaps a member of the town council at Ameria.
 Titus Travius Felix, a brickmaker whose wares have been found at various sites throughout Italy.
 Titus Travius Fortunatus, a potter whose maker's mark was found at Rome and Ostia in Latium.
 Travia P. f. Secci, buried at Brixia in Venetia and Histria, along with Lucius Popillius Senex.
 Travia Q. f. Tertia, buried at Aquinum in Latium.
 Marcus Travius Thallus, built a tomb at Verona for himself and Livia Psyche.

Notes

See also
 List of Roman gentes

References

Bibliography
 Quintus Horatius Flaccus (Horace), Satirae (Satires).
 Pomponius Porphyrion, Commentarii in Q. Horatium Flaccum (Commentaries on Horace).
 Theodor Mommsen et alii, Corpus Inscriptionum Latinarum (The Body of Latin Inscriptions, abbreviated CIL), Berlin-Brandenburgische Akademie der Wissenschaften (1853–present).
 Ettore Pais, Corporis Inscriptionum Latinarum Supplementa Italica (Italian Supplement to the Corpus Inscriptionum Latinarum), Rome (1884).
 René Cagnat et alii, L'Année épigraphique (The Year in Epigraphy, abbreviated AE), Presses Universitaires de France (1888–present).
 Paul von Rohden, Elimar Klebs, & Hermann Dessau, Prosopographia Imperii Romani (The Prosopography of the Roman Empire, abbreviated PIR), Berlin (1898).
 Scavi di Ostia, 1953–present.

Roman gentes